Mangelia maoica is a minute extinct species of sea snail, a marine gastropod mollusk in the family Mangeliidae.

Description
The length of the shell attains 4 mm, its diameter 1.5 mm.

(Original description) The small shell is turreted. The protoconch contains 4 whorls, glassy, the last volution carinated and delicately longitudinally ribbed. The 4 subsequent whorls are strongly carinated in young shells but in the adult the body whorl becomes gently rounded, losing the carina. In some specimens the entire surface is adorned with microscopic, frosty, beaded spiral threads alternating with still finer granular lines, in other shells the beaded spirals are inconspicuous over the general surface, but become progressively stronger on approaching the suture. The one bordering the suture are the strongest. The whorls contain ten undulating ribs, slightly tuberculate at the carina, extending from suture to suture. The outer lip is thickened in adult, sinus U-shaped and deep.

Distribution
This extinct marine species was found in Miocene strata of the Dominican Republic.

References

External links
 Worldwide Mollusc Species Data Base: Mangelia maoica

maoica
Gastropods described in 1917